Åtvidaberg Municipality (Åtvidabergs kommun) is a  municipality in Östergötland County in southeastern Sweden. Its seat is located in the town of Åtvidaberg, with some 7,000 inhabitants.

The present municipality was established in 1971 when the market town (köping) of Åtvidaberg (instituted in 1947) was amalgamated with its surrounding rural municipalities. A part of the present territory was transferred from Kalmar County.

Localities
Berg
Björsäter
Falerum
Grebo
Åtvidaberg (seat)
Fröjerum

Notability
The Åtvidabergs Vagnfabrik (Wagon Factory), was founded in 1910 and constructed early cars. A total of 12 cars were made. They resembled the American carriage with large wheels.

The Åtvidaberg church "Stora Kyrkan" ("the Big Church") was built in the 1870s in neo-Gothic style. The remains of a 17th-century church were also of interest. It was rebuilt and is now functioning as a church again, "Gamla Kyrkan" ("the Old Church").

At the end of the 19th century almost one third of the population of Åtvidaberg Municipality in Sweden emigrated to Ishpeming, Michigan in the United States as copper mines in the Åtvidaberg area closed down.[9] In 1994 this was commemorated by a plaquette at the Mormorsgruvan mine of Åtvidaberg.

References

External links

Åtvidaberg Municipality - Official site

Municipalities of Östergötland County